(John) Thomas Baines (27 November 1820 – 8 May 1875) was an English artist and explorer of British colonial southern Africa and Australia.

Life and work

Born in King's Lynn, Norfolk, on 27 November 1820, Baines was apprenticed to a coach painter at the age of 16. When he was 22 he left England for South Africa aboard the "Olivia" (captained by a family friend William Roome) and worked for a while in Cape Town as a scenic and portrait artist, and as official war artist during the so-called Eighth Frontier War for the British Army.

In 1855 Baines joined Augustus Gregory's 1855–1857 Royal Geographical Society sponsored expedition across northern Australia as official artist and storekeeper. The expedition's purpose was to explore the Victoria River district in the north-west and to evaluate the entire northern area of Australia in terms of its suitability for colonial settlement. His association with the North Australian Expedition was the highpoint of his career, and he was warmly commended for his contribution to it, to the extent that Mount Baines and the Baines River were named in his honour.

In 1858 Baines accompanied David Livingstone along the Zambezi, and was one of the first white men to view Victoria Falls. In 1869 Baines led one of the first gold prospecting expeditions to Mashonaland in what later became Rhodesia.

From 1861 to 1862 Baines and James Chapman undertook an expedition to South West Africa. Chapman's Travels in the Interior of South Africa (1868) and Baines' Explorations in South-West Africa (1864), provide a rare account of different perspectives on the same trip. This was the first expedition during which extensive use was made of both photography and painting, and in addition both men kept journals in which, amongst other things, they commented on their own and each other's practice.

Baines made some of the drawings for the engravings illustrating Alfred Russel Wallace's 1869 book The Malay Archipelago.

In 1870 Baines was granted a concession to explore for gold between the Gweru and Hunyani rivers by Lobengula, leader of the Matabele nation.

Thomas Baines died in Durban on 8 May 1875 and is buried in West Street Cemetery.

Legacy and Honors 
Baines is today best known for his detailed paintings and sketches which give a unique insight into colonial life in southern Africa and Australia.  Most of his work is held in London. Many of his pictures are held by the National Library of Australia, National Archives of Zimbabwe, National Maritime Museum, Brenthurst Library and the Royal Geographical Society. There are also numerous paintings at the Castle of Good Hope in Cape Town. The Thomas Baines Nature Reserve in the Eastern Cape of South Africa was also named after him.

Baines is also commemorated in the Aloe bainesii T.-Dyer, Albuca bainesii Baker, Iboza bainesii N.E.Br and many others.

Publications

 Thomas Baines, Explorations in South-West Africa: being an account of a journey in the years 1861 and 1862 from Walvisch Bay, on the Western Coast to Lake Ngami and the Victoria Falls (London: Longman, Green, Longman, Roberts, & Green, 1864).
 Thomas Baines, The gold regions of south eastern Africa (London: Edward Stanford, 1877).
 J.P.R. Wallis (ed.), The northern goldfields diaries of Thomas Baines (London: Chatto & Windus, 1946).
 Fay Jaff, They came to South Africa (Cape Town: Timmins, 1963).
 J.P.R. Wallis, Thomas Baines, his life and explorations in South Africa, Rhodesia and Australia, 1820–1875 (Cape Town: A.A. Balkema, 1976).
 Russell Braddon, Thomas Baines and the North Australian Expedition (Sydney: Collins in association with the Royal Geographical Society, 1986).
 Jane Carruthers and Marion Arnold, The life and work of Thomas Baines (Vlaeberg, South Africa: Fernwood Press, 1995).
 Historic Houses Trust, Cape Town, halfway to Sydney 1788–1870: treasures from The Brenthurst Library Johannesburg (Sydney: Historic Houses Trust, 2005).
 William Barry Lord lavishly illustrated by Thomas Baines Shifts and Expedients of Camp Life, Travel and Exploration (1876)
 "Thomas Baines of King's Lynn, Artist and Traveller". by Henry J. Hillen. serialised in "The King's Lynn News and Norfolk County Press" published between 12 March and 10 September 1898. Transcribed copies are in the King's Lynn Library, and Museum.

References

External links

 Baines' works in the National Library of Australia, Canberra
 Baines' works in the National Maritime Museum, Greenwich
 Jane Carruthers, 'Thomas Baines: Artist-Explorer of Australia and Southern Africa', NLA News, October 2005, Volume XVI, Number 1 (archived 18 September 2006)
 Biography and bibliography for Thomas Baines
 Thomas Baines: From the cradle to the grave
 
 
 Baine's work in the Cory Library for Historical Research collection 
 Jan-Bart Gewald: To Grahamstown and back. Towards a socio-cultural history of Southern Africa. Inaugural lecture, Leiden University, 2014

19th-century English painters
English male painters
English explorers
British war artists
Explorers of Africa
Explorers of Australia
People from King's Lynn
1820 births
1875 deaths
Fellows of the Royal Geographical Society
19th-century English male artists